Scop is a general name for an Old English poet. Scop or SCOP may also refer to:

Scop
Scops owl
Scop., taxonomic author abbreviation of Giovanni Antonio Scopoli (1723–1788), Italian physician and naturalist

SCOP
 Structural Classification of Proteins
 Suprachiasmatic nucleus circadian oscillatory protein, a member of the leucine-rich repeat protein family
 Société coopérative, a type of corporation in France
 Standing Conference of Principals, a British higher education organisation
 Seasonal Coefficient of Performance, a measure for the efficiency of a heat pump
 Supreme Court of Pennsylvania, the highest court in the Commonwealth of Pennsylvania.

See also
 Centro SCOP (Mexico City Metrobús), a BRT station in Mexico City